Carole Jane Cadwalladr (born 1969) is a British author, investigative journalist and features writer. She is a features writer for The Observer and formerly worked at The Daily Telegraph. Cadwalladr rose to international prominence in 2018 for her role in exposing the Facebook–Cambridge Analytica data scandal for which she was a finalist for the 2019 Pulitzer Prize for National Reporting, alongside The New York Times reporters.

Early life
Cadwalladr was born in Taunton, Somerset, and raised in Merthyr Tydfil, South Wales. She was educated at Radyr Comprehensive School, Cardiff, and Hertford College, Oxford.

Career
Cadwalladr's first novel, The Family Tree, was shortlisted for the 2006 Commonwealth Writers' Prize, the Author's Club First Novel Award, the Waverton Good Read Award, and the Wales Book of the Year. It was also dramatised as a five-part serial on BBC Radio 4. In the US, it was a New York Times Book Review Editor's Choice. The Family Tree was translated into several languages including Spanish, Italian, German, Czech, and Portuguese.

As a journalist, her work in the second decade of the 21st century has been about issues related to technology. She has for example, interviewed Jimmy Wales, the founder of Wikipedia.

Starting in late 2016 The Observer published an extensive series of articles by Cadwalladr about what she called the "right-wing fake news ecosystem".

Anthony Barnett wrote in the blog of The New York Review of Books about Cadwalladr's articles in The Observer, which have reported malpractice by campaigners for Brexit, and the illicit funding of Vote Leave, in the 2016 EU membership referendum. She has also reported on alleged links between Nigel Farage, the 2016 presidential campaign of Donald Trump, and the Russian influence on the 2016 presidential election that has been investigated in the United States. With regard to the Trump presidential campaign allegation, although the full report remains unpublished, the Mueller investigation reported that it had not found evidence that the Trump campaign had conspired with the Russian influence on the 2016 presidential election. Before Cambridge Analytica closed operations in 2018, the company took legal action against The Observer for the claims made in Cadwalladr's articles.

In April 2019, Cadwalladr gave a 15-minute TED talk about the links between Facebook and Brexit, entitled "Facebook's role in Brexit — and the threat to democracy". It was one of the opening talks of TED's 2019 conference and Cadwalladr called out the 'Gods of Silicon Valley – Mark Zuckerberg, Sheryl Sandberg, Sergey Brin, Larry Page & Jack Dorsey' by name. She accused Facebook of breaking democracy, a moment described as a 'truth bomb'. TED's curator Chris Anderson  invited Mark Zuckerberg to come and give his response, an offer he declined. Anderson later listed the talk as one of the best ones of 2019. According to Cadwalladr, the founders of Facebook and Google were sponsoring the conference and the co-founder of Twitter was speaking at it." She summarised her speech in an article in The Observer: "as things stood, I didn't think it was possible to have free and fair elections ever again. That liberal democracy was broken. And they had broken it." The speech was applauded. Some of the "tech giants" criticised complained about "factual inaccuracies", but when invited to specify them did not respond.

Libel action  
Arron Banks initiated a libel action against Cadwalladr on 12 July 2019 for claiming that he had lied about 'his relationship with the Russian government', notably in her TED talk. Banks lost the case on 13 June 2022 despite the court finding that Cadwalladr's comments were defamatory.

Seven press freedom groups joined forces to express their alarm at the lawsuit, calling for it to be dropped and calling on the British government to defend public-interest journalism. Reporters Without Borders (RSF), ARTICLE 19, the European Federation of Journalists (EFJ), the European Centre for Press and Media Freedom (ECPMF), Greenpeace UK, the Index on Censorship, PEN International and Scottish PEN described the suit as 'vexatious in nature and intended to silence Cadwalladr's courageous investigative journalism. We call on Banks to drop this abusive lawsuit and cease efforts to stifle public interest reporting.' The letter described the case a so-called SLAPP suit – Strategic Litigation Against Public Participation. The organisations commented on the unusual step of suing Cadwalladr as an individual journalist but not the Guardian or TED. 'We note with concern the abusive approach Banks has taken in targeting Cadwalladr as an individual on the basis of comments she made orally – including a single sentence in a TED talk – and on Twitter, rather than similar reporting that had been published in The Guardian.'

In January 2020 Banks dropped two elements of his action. According to The Guardian, "Banks's lawyers argued this meant there were strong grounds to believe he would assist the interests of the Russian government, against those of the British government, in exchange for that money". Cadwalladr's lawyers had argued this meant there were reasonable grounds to investigate. However, the judge concluded that, in context, the Ted Talk and the related tweet meant that "On more than one occasion Mr Banks told untruths about a secret relationship he had with the Russian government in relation to acceptance of foreign funding of electoral campaigns in breach of the law on such funding". The judge had earlier cautioned that "broadcasts and public speeches should not be interpreted as though they were formal written texts",  and "emphasised that the ordinary reader or listener would not minutely analyse possible interpretations of words like a libel lawyer".

On 6 November 2020 while the libel case continued, Cadwalladr deleted and apologised for a recent tweet in which she claimed that Banks had broken the law. The Electoral Commission ruled that Leave.EU, the campaign that Arron Banks founded and funded, broke UK electoral law. In addition, the ICO (Information Commissioner's Office) found Leave.EU had broken data laws but Arron Banks was not held personally responsible.

On 26 November 2020, the day before a strike-out hearing, the Press Gazette reported that she "has been ordered to pay £62,000 in costs to Banks after withdrawing her defences of truth and limitation just one day before the next hearing in the case was scheduled to take place on Thursday morning", in the light of the judge's determination of the meaning of certain words. In a statement published on its website, her solicitors noted that "contrary to some reporting, Carole has not made any admissions and stands by her public interest reporting. She will continue to defend the claim and we anticipate that the case will be heard at trial next year".

On 13 June 2022, Banks lost the case. In a High Court ruling, his case was dismissed as the judge concluded that Cadwalladr had a reasonable belief that her comments were in the public interest. The judge said: "In circumstances where Ms Cadwalladr has no defence of truth, and her defence of public interest has succeeded only in part, it is neither fair nor apt to describe this as a Slapp suit". On 24 June 2022 the High Court granted Banks leave to appeal on a question of law relating to the 'serious harm' test.

In February 2023 the Court of Appeal rejected two of Banks's three legal challenges. On the third challenge the court ruled that continuing publication of the April 2019 TED Talk, after the Electoral Commission published a report on 29 April 2020 that found no evidence of Banks breaking the law in relation to campaign donations, had caused "serious harm" to Banks' reputation. The Court ordered that damages should be assessed for the harm incurred between 29 April 2020 and the date of the High Court ruling in June 2022. A spokesperson for Guardian News Media noted that Cadwalladr does not have control over continued publication of her TED talk and that Banks had chosen not to sue the TED organisation for doing so.

Other
Cadwalladr is a founder of "All the Citizens", a not-for-profit organisation registered as a UK-based private company limited by guarantee. The organisation is made up of journalists, filmmakers, advertising creatives, data scientists, artists, students and lawyers, and intends to crowdfund individual projects and campaigns.

In 2023 Cadwalladr published an open letter praising Carol Vorderman for speaking out about "corruption and the chancers, embezzlers, spivs and hustlers who've been accused of making millions out of government contracts – and the ministers who've enabled them ... no-one else is doing it" and speaking "as if women had the right to live their lives without having to give a toss about societal expectations".

Journalism awards 
 British Journalism Awards' Technology Journalism Award in December 2017 
 Specialist Journalist of the Year 2017 at the National Society of Editors Press Awards
 Orwell Prize for Political Journalism in June 2018 (for her work "on the impact of big data on the EU Referendum and the 2016 US presidential election").
 Reporters without Borders "L'esprit de RSF" award in November 2018 (for her work on subversion of democratic processes).
 The 2018 Polk Award for National Reporting with reporters from the New York Times.
 The 2018 Stieg Larsson Prize, an annual award of 200,000 krona for people working in Stieg Larsson's spirit
 Political Studies Association Journalist of the Year in November 2018 (joint award with Amelia Gentleman) for her persistence and resilience in pursuing "investigative journalism on subjects such as personal data".
 Two 2018 British Journalism Awards for Technology reporting and Investigation
 Technology journalist of the year in the 2018 Society of Editors awards
 The 2019 Gerald Loeb Award for Investigative Reporting
The annual Hay Festival's Medal for Journalism in May 2019, "for the heroic and rigorous investigative journalism".
Finalist, 2019 Pulitzer Prize for National Reporting, alongside The New York Times reporters, for her coverage of the Cambridge Analytica scandal.

Works

References

External links
Carole Cadwalladr at The Guardian
Collected reviews of The Family Tree
Carole Cadwalladr, Investigative journalist at TED
 TED Talk
"The Links Between Russia, Trump And Brexit" Cadwalladr interview on NPR's Fresh Air
Review of The Family Tree, by Patricia T. O'Conner in New York Times Review of Books

1969 births
Living people
21st-century British women writers
British women novelists
21st-century British novelists
People educated at Radyr Comprehensive School
Alumni of Hertford College, Oxford
Gerald Loeb Award winners for Investigative
British journalists
The Observer people